Deraeocorinae is a subfamily of plant bugs in the family Miridae. There are more than 40 genera and around 500 described species in Deraeocorinae.

Genera
These 41 genera belong to the subfamily Deraeocorinae:

 Acutifromiris Hernandez & Stonedahl, 1999
 Agastictus Bergroth, 1922
 Alloeotomus Fieber, 1858
 Ambracius Stal, 1860
 Apoderaeocoris Nakatani, Yasunaga et Takai, 2007
 Bothynotus Fieber, 1864
 Cephalomiroides Hernandez & Stonedahl, 1999
 Cimicicapsus Poppius, 1915
 Cimidaeorus Hsiao & Ren, 1983
 Clivinema Reuter, 1876
 Conocephalocoris Knight, 1927
 Democoris Cassis, 1995
 Deraeocapsus Knight, 1921
 Deraeocoris Kirschbaum, 1856
 Diplozona Van Duzee, 1915
 Dominicanocoris Ferreira, 1996
 Eurybrochis Kirkaldy, 1902
 Eurychilopterella Reuter, 1909
 Eustictus Reuter, 1909
 Fennahiella Carvalho, 1955
 Fingulus Distant, 1904
 Hesperophylum Reuter & Poppius, 1912
 Hyaliodes Reuter, 1876
 Idiomiris China, 1963
 Imogen Kirkaldy, 1905
 Kalamemiris Hosseini & Cassis, 2017
 Klopicoris Van Duzee, 1915
 Kundakimuka Cassis, 1995
 Largidea Van Duzee, 1912
 Paracarniella Henry & Ferreira, 2003
 Paracarnus Distant, 1884
 Philicoris Menard & Siler, 2018
 Platycapsus Reuter, 1904
 Pseudocamptobrochis Poppius, 1911
 Scutellograndis Hernandez & Stonedahl, 1999
 Stethoconus Flor, 1861tribus Saturniomirini Carvalho, 1952
 Strobilocapsus Bliven, 1956
 Synthlipsis Kirkaldy, 1908
 Termatomiris Ghauri, 1975
 Termatophylum Reuter, 1884
 Trilaccus Horvath, 1902

References

Further reading